Chocolate box may refer to:
 Chocolate box art, an art genre
 "Chocolate Box", a song by Bros from The Time
 "Chocolate Box", a song by Prince from Lotusflower
 The Chocolate Box, a short story by Agatha Christie
 Buddha and the Chocolate Box, an album by Cat Stevens

See also
 Chocolate